Finland-Mexico relations are diplomatic relations between Finland and Mexico. Both nations are members of the Organisation for Economic Co-operation and Development and the United Nations.

History
On 13 July 1920, Mexico recognized the independence of Finland from Russia. On 2 October 1936, Finland and Mexico signed a Treaty of Friendship in Washington, D.C., United States which officially established diplomatic relations between both nations. In December 1939, during the Winter War, Mexican President Lázaro Cárdenas sent a message of solidarity to the Finnish people.

In 1949, a few years after the end of World War II, Finland and Mexico formally accredited ambassadors to each other's nations, respectively. The first Mexican embassy accredited to Finland was based in Stockholm, Sweden with Gilberto Bosques Saldívar becoming the first Mexican Ambassador accredited to Finland. The first Finnish embassy accredited to Mexico was based in Washington, D.C. In 1964, resident embassies were established in each other's capitals, respectively. In February 1999, President Martti Ahtisaari became the first Finnish head-of-state to pay a visit to Mexico. In October 2016, Finnish Prime Minister Juha Sipilä paid an official visit to Mexico and met with Mexican President Enrique Peña Nieto.  During the meeting, the leaders highlighted the excellent state of bilateral political dialogue and the importance of President Sauli Niinistö's state visit to Mexico in May 2015 to give a renewed impetus to the ties between Mexico and Finland.

In 2016, both nations celebrated 80 years of diplomatic relations and announced direct flights between Helsinki and Puerto Vallarta with Finnair which commenced in November 2017.

High-level visits

High-level visits from Finland to Mexico

 President Martti Ahtisaari (February 1999)
 President Tarja Halonen (March 2002)
 President Sauli Niinistö (May 2015)
 Prime Minister Juha Sipilä (October 2016)

High-level visits from Mexico to Finland
 Foreign Undersecretary Carlos de Icaza (2014)
 Foreign Minister José Antonio Meade (2015)
 Director General for Europe Bernardo Aguilar Calvo (2021)

Bilateral agreements
Both nations have signed several bilateral agreements such as an Agreement on Economic, Scientific and Technological Cooperation (1975); Agreement on Inter-cultural Exchanges (1983); Agreement on the Avoidance of Double-Taxation (1999); Agreement on the Promotion and Reciprocal Protection of Investments (2000); Memorandum of Understanding on Cooperation in Forest Preservation (2011); Memorandum of Understanding in Water Management Cooperation (2011); Memorandum of Understanding between the Viikki Tropical Resources Institute (VITRI) of the University of Helsinki  and the Mexican National Forestry Commission (CONAFOR) (2015); Memorandum of Understanding on Cooperation in Export Credit between Finnvera of Finland and Bancomext of Mexico (2015) and a Memorandum of Understanding between FINPRO and ProMéxico (2015).

Tourism and Transportation
In 2015, 14,000 Finnish citizens visited Mexico for touristic purposes. There are direct flights between Finland and Mexico with the following airlines: Finnair and TUI Airways.

Trade
In 1997, Mexico signed a Free Trade Agreement with the European Union (which includes Finland). Since the implementation of the free trade agreement in 2000, trade between the two nations has increased dramatically. In 2018, two-way trade between Mexico and Finland was US$715 million. Between 1999 and 2012, Finnish companies invested over US$676 million in Mexico. Finland is Mexico fifteenth most important trading partner within the EU. Finland's main exports to Mexico include: Machinery and transport equipment and manufactured products. Mexico's main exports to Finland include: Machinery and transport equipment; chemicals and related products; food and beverages. Mexican multinational companies Cemex and Mexichem operate in Finland.

Resident diplomatic missions
 Finland has an embassy in Mexico City. 
 Mexico has an embassy in Helsinki.

See also
 Foreign relations of Finland 
 Foreign relations of Mexico
 Mexico–European Union relations
 Mexicans in Finland

References 

 

 
Mexico
Finland